ServiceOntario is part of the Ministry of Public and Business Service Delivery which provides a single point of contact for core provincial government services to individuals and businesses in the province of Ontario, Canada. Established in 2006 from the existing network of Driver and Vehicle License Issuing Offices, ServiceOntario provides services primarily online and in-person at storefront locations, and also operates telephone call centres.

Some services were also formerly provided by automated ServiceOntario self-service kiosks located primarily in shopping malls. Following the discovery in 2012 that illegal card skimming devices were installed on some kiosks in the Greater Toronto Area, all kiosks were shut down province-wide for security reasons. The provincial government permanently discontinued the kiosks later that year.

Some ServiceOntario locations are operated by private businesses under contract to the government.

Services 
The following are some of the services delivered by ServiceOntario on behalf of the government:
Ontario Health Insurance Plan health card registration
Birth, marriage and death certificates
Driver and vehicle licensing (except driver testing and related transactions, which are generally delivered by DriveTest centres operated under contract by Serco)
Business registration
Fishing and hunting licences
Address change
Newborn registration
Ontario government publications

See also
 Service Canada

References

External links

Ontario government departments and agencies